See "Scutelnic" for the origin of the name.

Scutelnici is a commune in Buzău County, Muntenia, Romania. It is composed of four villages: Arcanu, Brăgăreasa, Lipănescu and Scutelnici.

Notes

Communes in Buzău County
Localities in Muntenia